Tariqa Waters (born 1980) is a multifaceted contemporary artist known for her whimsical larger-than-life fabrications, paintings, self-portraitures and installations. Waters works in varied media- canvas, wood, plastic, ceramics, paint, and photography. Her technicolor characterizations of multigenerational commercial references reclaim an authentic and sincere aesthetic steeped in effortless regality and proudly celebrated traditions. 
Waters’ work has been featured in numerous institutions and galleries including the Seattle Art Museum, Frye Art Museum, Hedreen Gallery, and Pivot Art + Culture. Waters’ work has been featured in issues of Rolling Stone France and Madame Figaro magazines. In 2016, her critically acclaimed solo exhibition, 100% Kanekalon: The Untold Story of the Marginalized Matriarch, exhibited at the Northwest African American Museum. In 2020 Waters’ much anticipated exhibition, Yellow No.5 debuted at the Bellevue Arts Museum. 
As the founding owner of Martyr Sauce Pop Art Museum & Gallery, located in the historic arts district of Pioneer Square, Waters is dedicated to cultivating artistic space and community. Waters has served in various arts organizations and institutions as well as co-founding Re:Definition gallery at the Paramount Theater in 2015, an on-going partnership with the Seattle Theatre Group redefining historic cultural space. In addition to Waters’ being a featured keynote speaker, Martyr Sauce became a Cultural Partner of the Seattle Art Fair the summer 2017. 
In the summer of 2021 Waters expanded Martyr Sauce into a pop art museum MS PAM. Waters new and innovative chapter commissions artists in collaborative works facilitating transformative and immersive experiences through public engagement.

Early life and education 
Born in Richmond, Virginia and having lived in Washington DC, Atlanta, and Sicily, Waters arrived in Seattle in 2012. Waters is a self-taught artist.

Career
Waters opened Martyr Sauce in 2013, as an artist-led gallery and neighborhood cultural institution, showcasing underrepresented artists. In 2015, along with the late Jonathan Moore, she founded RE: DEFINITION, a gallery at the Paramount Theater bar with the same aim of elevating underrepresented artists, as well as redefining historic cultural space.

Alongside her work at Martyr Sauce and RE:DEFINITION, Waters continued work on her own art. Her solo exhibition, 100% Kanekalon: The Untold Story of the Marginalized Matriarch, opened at the Northwest African American Museum in Seattle in 2016.

Waters, curated a highly reviewed group exhibition called Yellow Number 5 at the Bellevue Arts Museum, in Bellevue Washington, held in 2020 and 2021. As Bellevue Arts Museum first Black and Black woman curator, Waters succeeded in the removal of Executive Director Benedict Heywood and held Bellevue Arts Museum board and staff accountable to confront BAM’s racism and other intersectional systems of oppression.
In the summer of 2021 Waters expanded Martyr Sauce into a pop art museum MS PAM. Waters new and innovative chapter commissions artists in collaborative works facilitating transformative and immersive experiences through public engagement.

References

1980 births
Living people
20th-century American women artists
21st-century American women artists
American multimedia artists
20th-century African-American women
20th-century African-American artists
21st-century African-American women
21st-century African-American artists
American women curators
American curators